The Punggol Zoo (1928–1942), formally Singapore Zoological Gardens and Bird Park at Punggol, is a former animal collection in Singapore. Founded by Singaporean-Indian land owner William Lawrence Soma Basapa, the name comes from the location on an 11-hectare site on Punggol Road, possibly near Sungei Dekar (now called Coney Channel). The zoo persisted until just before the Japanese occupation of Singapore during World War II.

Originally located on Serangoon Road before a move to larger quarters, the collection included 200 animals, including a Bengal tiger named Apay, seals, polar bears, chimpanzees, spectacled monkeys, Shetland ponies, zebras, a black leopard, Malayan tapirs, and orangutans, as well as 2,000 birds. Albert Einstein likely visited the zoo in 1922 while on a fundraising trip for the Hebrew University of Jerusalem. The zoo was also visited and described by international correspondent Sir Percival Phillips. A python-wrestling scene in the 1930s exploitation film Forbidden Adventure starring English actor M.H. Kenyon-Slade, was reportedly filmed at the Punggol Zoo.

The zoo was destroyed when "British moved their forces to the north of Singapore in anticipation of invading Japanese forces. Basapa was given 24 hours to relocate his animals and birds. The time-frame was too tight so the British took the land, released the birds and shot the rest." Another account says, "The dangerous varieties of animals were killed, while harmless ones were released into the forest." Remember Singapore states, "Identifying the Punggol end as a potential landing site for the Japanese invaders, the British forces wanted to make use of the Ponggol Zoo as a defensive ground...After the fall of Singapore, the Japanese confiscated Basapa's power generators and steel cages, using the site to store their supplies and ammunition." Reginald Burton, in his memoir of "personal experiences as a captain in the 4th Battalion, Royal Norfolk Regiment, captured by the Japanese after the fall of Singapore in 1942," describes encountering a zebra released from the zoo. He wrote, "Punggol Point...had been shelled and there was nobody to care for the animals, so when the 5th Suffolks took up their position they released what animals they found there, at least giving them a chance of survival."

Basapa was the first Singaporean inducted into the Zoological Society of Great Britain. He died in 1943.

Notes

References

External links
 Singapore Basapa

Demolished buildings and structures in Singapore
Zoos in Singapore
Former zoos
1928 establishments in Singapore
1942 disestablishments in Singapore